Eugene Mulligan (born 1949 in Rhode, County Offaly) is an Irish former Gaelic footballer. He played for his local club Rhode and was a member of the Offaly senior inter-county team from 1968 until 1980.

References

1967
 

1949 births
Living people
Offaly inter-county Gaelic footballers
Rhode Gaelic footballers